RoEllen (also Roellen) is an unincorporated community in Dyer County, Tennessee, United States.

Notable people
Joe Bradshaw, baseball player, was born in RoEllen.

References

Unincorporated communities in Dyer County, Tennessee
Unincorporated communities in Tennessee